Hispanophobia  (from Latin Hispanus, "Spanish" and Greek φοβία (phobia), "fear") or anti-Spanish sentiment is a fear, distrust, hatred of; aversion to, or discrimination against the Spanish language, Hispanic, Latino and/or Spanish people, and/or Hispanic culture. The historical phenomenon has gone through three main stages by originating in 16th-century Europe, reawakening during 19th-century disputes over Spanish and Mexican territory such as the Spanish–American War and the Mexican–American War, and continuing to exist to the present day in tandem with politically-charged controversies such as bilingual education and illegal immigration to the United States.

In Spain, identity politics is complex because Catalan, Basque, and Galician nationalism are identified as sources of hispanophobic views and discourse.

History

"Black legend"

Early instances of hispanophobia arose as the influence of the Spanish Empire and the Spanish Inquisition spread throughout Europe during the Late Middle Ages. Hispanophobia then materialized in folklore that is sometimes referred to as the "black legend":

La leyenda negra, as Spanish historians first named it, entailed a view of Spaniards as "unusually cruel, avaricious, treacherous, fanatical, superstitious, hot-blooded, corrupt, decadent, indolent, and authoritarian". During the European colonization of the Americas, "[t]he Black Legend informed Anglo Americans' judgments about the political, economic, religious, and social forces that had shaped the Spanish provinces from Florida to California, as well as throughout the hemisphere". These judgments were handed down from Europeans who saw the Spaniards as inferior to other European cultures.

In North America, hispanophobia thus preceded the United States Declaration of Independence by almost 200 years. Historians theorize that North European nations promoted hispanophobia in order to justify attacks on Spain's colonies in the Americas. New Englanders engaged in hispanophobic efforts to assimilate Spanish colonies:

United States
In the early 20th century, Anglo-Americans used eugenics as a basis for their hispanophobia in the United States. With support from the eugenicist, C.M. Goethe, hispanophobia became a political issue. "Another circumstance," according to historian David J. Weber, "that shaped the depth of Anglo Americans' hispanophobia was the degree to which they saw Hispanics as an obstacle to their ambitions". As the US grew into a republic, anti-Spanish sentiment exhibited a recrudescence. Spain was perceived as both the antithesis of the separation of church and state and a paragon of monarchy and colonialism, which apparently fundamental opposition to the American founding principles fueled hostility that would eventually culminate in the Spanish–American War of 1898. Hispanophobia is particularly evident in the historiography of the Texas Revolution:

Throughout the 20th century, an array of mostly political and economic forces drove immigration from a multitude of Spanish-speaking countries, such as Cuba, Guatemala, the Dominican Republic, and Mexico, to the relatively strong economy and stable political environment of the United States. Nearly all the Spanish-speaking immigrants were Roman Catholic, as opposed to the nation's Protestant majority. As a result, according to some historians, Americans "now have something called a 'Hispanic', which describes not someone born in a Spanish-speaking country, someone who speaks Spanish well or badly, or even someone with a Hispanic surname but someone who identifies himself as such". As a key corollary to that development, it is toward that group, which is not precisely or rigorously defined, that American hispanophobia is now predominantly oriented. Many forms of hispanophobia endemic to the Texas Revolution still flourish in the United States today.

Forms of Hispanophobia in the contemporary United States

"Official English"
Sociologists cite the "Official English" or the English-only movement, together with hispanophobic jokes and discourse, as a prominent example of modern hispanophobia.
The "Official English movement" has been criticized because its mass appeal is not as relating to any measurable benefit that would result from the eradication of bilingual education and other bilingual services. Rather, its appeal results from the fact that "challenges to the status of one's language typically engage deep-seated feelings about national identity and group worth". Proponents of that view note that the English-only movement attracts public support primarily by functioning as a hispanophobic form of intimidation.

Immigration controversy

Citing groups such as the Minuteman Project, sociologists have concluded that some arguments against illegal immigration in the United States have been tainted with xenophobia and hispanophobia, many of them drawing on concepts of racial purity and eugenics. The groups' concern with illegal immigration, they assert, "lies not in immigration per se., which has declined in the last decade, but in the changing national origin of new immigrants, that is immigrants are now mainly Latin American or Asian, which is seen as a threat to the Anglo-Saxon tradition".

In 2006, Arizona Attorney General Terry Goddard and US Attorney Paul Charlton sent a letter of complaint to Federal Communications Commission Chairman Kevin Martin, in response to the following comments made by radio host Brian James:

Calling the speech "dangerous and totally irresponsible for anyone, particularly a licensed body using public airways", Goddard and Charlton expressed concern that it would lead to violence in the state in which conflict over illegal immigration was increasingly heated. The radio host said the remarks were "satirical", and the radio station, KFYI, indicated that James was trying out for a regular position on the station and was not an employee.

A New Jersey internet radio host, white supremacist, and convicted felon, Hal Turner, used to broadcast out of his house and made similar remarks, some of which were posted by the Anti-Defamation League under the category extremism. On April 1, 2006, Turner said:

See also

:Category:Racially motivated violence against Hispanic and Latino Americans
Anti-Catholicism
Anti-Catholicism in the United States
Anti-Mexican sentiment
Latin American diaspora
Latin America–United States relations
Migration from Latin America to Europe
Racism in the United States#Hispanic and Latino Americans
Spain–United States relations
Spanish diaspora
Stereotypes of groups within the United States
Stereotypes of Latino Americans in the United States

References

Sources
 William D. Carrigan and Clive Webb, "The Lynching of Persons of Mexican Origin or Descent in the United States, 1848 to 1928," Journal of Social History, vol. 37, no. 2 (Winter 2003), pp. 411–438. In JSTOR.
 Juan Francisco Maura, "La hispanofobia a través de algunos textos de la conquista de América: de la propaganda política a la frivolidad académica," Bulletin of Spanish Studies, vol. 83, no. 2 (2006), pp. 213–240.

External links
GalleryBlog on Latina/o Stereotypes that also works to document anti-Latina/o hysteria in U.S. mass culture. This blog serves as a constantly updated resource for Tex(t)-Mex, a University of Texas Press volume (2007)

 
Racism
16th-century introductions
Prejudice and discrimination by type
Anti-national sentiment
Racism in the United States